The 1973 Kansas City Royals season was their fifth in Major League Baseball. Jack McKeon replaced the fired Bob Lemon as manager and the Royals finished second in the American League West with a record of 88-74, six games behind the Oakland Athletics. Kansas City's 88 wins were the most in franchise history. Paul Splittorff (20-11) became the first Royals pitcher to win 20 games in a season.

Offseason 
 November 30, 1972: Roger Nelson and Richie Scheinblum were traded by the Royals to the Cincinnati Reds for Hal McRae and Wayne Simpson.
 February 1, 1973: Joe Keough was traded by the Royals to the Chicago White Sox for Jim Lyttle.

Regular season 
On April 10, the Royals open their new park, Royals Stadium, with a 12–1 rout of the Texas Rangers. The game is attended by 39,464 fans braving 39-degree weather.

On April 16, Steve Busby threw the first no-hitter in Royals history. The Royals beat Detroit by a score of 3–0.

On May 15, in a game against the Royals, Nolan Ryan of the California Angels threw the first no-hitter of his career.

On August 2, George Brett made his major league debut.

Season standings

Record vs. opponents

Notable transactions 
 April 2, 1973: Greg Minton was traded by the Royals to the San Francisco Giants for Fran Healy.
 May 8, 1973: Tom Murphy was traded by the Royals to the St. Louis Cardinals for Al Santorini.
 June 5, 1973: 1973 Major League Baseball draft
Ruppert Jones was drafted by the Royals in the 3rd round.
Rob Picciolo was drafted by the Royals in the 4th round of the secondary phase, but did not sign.

Roster

Player stats

Batting

Starters by position 
Note: Pos = Position; G = Games played; AB = At bats; H = Hits; Avg. = Batting average; HR = Home runs; RBI = Runs batted in

Other batters 
Note: G = Games played; AB = At bats; H = Hits; Avg. = Batting average; HR = Home runs; RBI = Runs batted in

Pitching

Starting pitchers 
Note: G = Games pitched; IP = Innings pitched; W = Wins; L = Losses; ERA = Earned run average; SO = Strikeouts

Other pitchers 
Note: G = Games pitched; IP = Innings pitched; W = Wins; L = Losses; ERA = Earned run average; SO = Strikeouts

Relief pitchers 
Note: G = Games pitched; W = Wins; L = Losses; SV = Saves; ERA = Earned run average; SO = Strikeouts

Farm system 

LEAGUE CHAMPIONS: Kingsport, Billings

References

External links 

1973 Kansas City Royals at Baseball Reference
1973 Kansas City Royals at Baseball Almanac

Kansas City Royals seasons
Kansas City Royals season
Kansas City